Men's Combined World Cup 1983/1984

Calendar

Final point standings

In Men's Combined World Cup 1983/84 all five results count.

Note:

Race 3 and 4 not all points were awarded (not enough finishers).

World Cup
FIS Alpine Ski World Cup men's combined discipline titles